The 2009 Seguros Bolívar Open Bogotá was a professional tennis tournament played on outdoor red clay courts. This was the fifth edition of the tournament which is part of the 2009 ATP Challenger Tour. It took place in Bogotá, Colombia between 13 and 19 July 2009.

Singles entrants

Seeds

 Rankings are as of July 6, 2009.

Other entrants
The following players received wildcards into the singles main draw:
  Juan Sebastián Cabal
  Ricardo Corrente
  Alejandro González
  Carlos Salamanca

The following players received entry from the qualifying draw:
  Marcel Felder
  André Miele
  Kristian Pless
  Eduardo Struvay

Champions

Singles

 Marcos Daniel def.  Horacio Zeballos, 4–6, 7–6(5), 6–4

Doubles

 Sebastián Prieto /  Horacio Zeballos def.  Marcos Daniel /  Ricardo Mello, 6–4, 7–5

References
Official website of Seguros Bolívar Tennis

Seguros Bolivar Open Bogota
Clay court tennis tournaments
2009
2009 in Colombian tennis